Sean, also spelled Seán or Séan in Irish English, is a male given name of Irish origin. It comes from the Irish versions of the Biblical Hebrew name Yohanan, Seán (anglicized as Shaun/Shawn/Shon) and Séan (Ulster variant; anglicized  Shane/Shayne), rendered John in English and Johannes/Johann/Johan in other Germanic languages. The Norman French Jehan (see Jean) is another version.

For notable people named Sean, refer to List of people named Sean.

Origin
The name was adopted into the Irish language most likely from Jean, the French variant of the Hebrew name Yohanan. In 1066, the Norman duke, William the Conqueror conquered England, where the Norman French name Jahan/Johan came to be pronounced Jean, and spelled John. The Norman from the Welsh Marches, with the Norman King of England's mandate invaded parts of Leinster and Munster in the 1170s. The Irish nobility in these areas were replaced by Norman nobles, some of whom bore the Norman French name Johan or the anglicised name John. The Irish adapted the name to their own pronunciation and spelling, producing the name Seán (or Seathan).

The name was once the common equivalent of John in Ireland and Gaelic-speaking areas of Scotland, but has been supplanted by a vulgarization of its address form: Iain or Ian. When addressing someone named Seán in Irish, it becomes a Sheáin , and in Scotland was generally adapted into Scots and Highland English as Eathain, Eoin, Iain, and Ian (John has traditionally been more commonly used in the Scots-speaking Lowlands than any form of Seán). Even in Highland areas where Gaelic is still spoken, these anglicisations are now more common than Seán or Seathan, undoubtedly due in part to registrars in the United Kingdom of Great Britain and Ireland and the United Kingdom of Great Britain and Northern Ireland having long been instructed not to register Irish or Gaelic names in birth or baptismal registrations.

In other languages
 English: Sean, Seon, Shane, Shayne, Shaine, Shon, Shaun, Shawn, Seann, Shaan
 , Shôn
 Scottish Gaelic, Highland English and Scots: Eathain, Eoin, Iain, Ian
 
 ,

See also
 List of people named Sean
 Eoin
 Alternate forms for the name John
 John (given name)

References

External links
 Chinese translation of Sean

Given names
English-language masculine given names
English masculine given names
Irish-language masculine given names